Vnanje Gorice is a settlement  south of the capital Ljubljana in central Slovenia. It is located in the Ljubljana Marsh landscape park. The entire Municipality of Brezovica is part of the traditional region of Inner Carniola and is included in the Central Slovenia Statistical Region.

Name
The name Vnanje Gorice literally means 'outer hills', referring to a cluster of hills in the Ljubljana Marsh: Plešivica Hill, Big Peak, Gulč Hill, and others. The name distinguishes the settlement from neighboring Notranje Gorice (literally, 'inner hills') to the southwest. The name is derived from the Slovene common noun gorica 'hill', a diminutive of gora 'mountain'. The settlement was known as Außergoritz in German in the past.

Church

The local church was first mentioned in written documents dating to 1526, but the current building dates to the second half of the 19th century. It is currently dedicated to the Holy Spirit but was previously dedicated to Saint Sebastian. The church was remodeled in the Baroque style in 1742 and it was expanded in 1896. The side altars were created by Ivan Zajc in 1856, and the church was painted by Janez Šubic in 1870. The church is surrounded by a cemetery.

Notable people
Notable people that were born or lived in Vnanje Gorice include:
Edvard Gregorin (1897–1960), theater actor, director, and playwright
Valentin Kermavner (1835–1908), classical philologist and translator
Janek Musek (born 1945), psychologist
Jože Skubic (a.k.a. Edi) (1896–1944), Partisan soldier

References

External links

Vnanje Gorice on Geopedia

Populated places in the Municipality of Brezovica